Possibility is the condition or fact of being possible. Latin origins of the word hint at ability.

Possibility may refer to: 
 Probability, the measure of the likelihood that an event will occur
 Epistemic possibility, a topic in philosophy and modal logic
 Possibility theory, a mathematical theory for dealing with certain types of uncertainty and is an alternative to probability theory
 Subjunctive possibility, (also called alethic possibility) is a form of modality studied in modal logic. 
 Logical possibility, a proposition that will depend on the system of logic being considered, rather than on the violation of any single rule
 Possible world, a complete and consistent way the world is or could have been

Other 
Possible (Italy), a political party in Italy
Possible Peru, a political party in Peru
Possible Peru Alliance, an electoral alliance in Peru

Entertainment 
Kim Possible, a US children's TV series
Kim Possible (character), the central character of the TV series
Kim Possible (video game series), games related to the TV series
The Possible, a 2006 film
The Possible (band), a Japanese band
Possibility Pictures, a film production company which made the 2010 film Letters to God
Possibility (album), a 1985 album by Akina Nakamori
"Possibility" (song), a 2009 song by Lykke Li

See also
 
 

Impossible (disambiguation)
 Possibilities (disambiguation)
 Possible Worlds (disambiguation)
 :Category:Possibly living people
 Absolutely (disambiguation)
 Definitely (disambiguation)
 Maybe (disambiguation)